A list of books and essays about Joseph L. Mankiewicz:

Mankiewicz, Joseph L.